Hooton is a village in Cheshire West and Chester, England. It contains twelve listed buildings that are recorded in the National Heritage List for England. Of these, five are listed at Grade II*, the middle of the three grades, and the others are at Grade II, the lowest grade. Near to the village is the former RAF Hooton Park, and six of the listed buildings are part of this. The other listed buildings are houses, two churches, a war memorial, and the entrance lodge to a former country house.

Key

Buildings

See also

Listed buildings in Ellesmere Port
Listed buildings in Ledsham
Listed buildings in Willaston

References

Citations

Sources

Listed buildings in Cheshire West and Chester
Lists of listed buildings in Cheshire